Brian Angelichio (born December 27, 1972) is an American football tight ends coach for the Minnesota Vikings. He previously coached for the Panthers, Buccaneers, Browns, Packers, and Redskins.

NFL Coaching
Angelichio starting his tenure in the NFL coaching tight ends with the Tampa Bay Buccaneers when he came to the NFL from Rutgers with Greg Schiano. He was fired from the Buccaneers the same time as Schiano, leading him to spend two years coaching tight ends for the Cleveland Browns from 2014-2015. This was followed by three years of coaching tight ends for the Green Bay Packers. In 2019 he was not retained by Matt LaFleur and the Packers organization. He would end up spending the 2019 season coaching tight ends for the Washington Redskins. In 2020 it was announced Angelichio would join the Carolina Panthers as the team's tight ends coach.
In 2022 Kevin O'Connell hired Angelichio away from the Panthers to become the new Tight Ends/Passing Game Coordinator for the Minnesota Vikings.

References

1972 births
Living people
Carolina Panthers coaches
Cleveland Browns coaches
Green Bay Packers coaches
Tampa Bay Buccaneers coaches
Pittsburgh Panthers football coaches
Rutgers Scarlet Knights football coaches
Washington Redskins coaches
Minnesota Vikings coaches